Clayton Chitty, aka Clayton James (born March 18, 1985) is a Canadian actor and model. He is best known for his role in the Lifetime TV Movie Her Infidelity.

Early life
Chitty was born March 1985 in North Vancouver, and was raised by his single mother.  He started making his first films in which he directed, edited, and starred in with his childhood friends.

He began commercial auditions at age 21 when a family friend recommended a meet with a local talent agent. He then met teacher Andrew Mcilroy who inspired Clayton to pursue a career in acting.

Clayton has trained in Los Angeles and in Vancouver. He has worked on TV shows such as Supernatural, The Killing, Fringe, and King & Maxwell. His big break came starring opposite Rachel Hunter in Her Infidelity in 2015. He  played a Superhero in the reboot of Electra Woman and Dyna Girl in 2016  and is  a spokesperson for Gibson's Whisky.

Filmography

Film

Television

References

External links 

 
 

1985 births
Living people
Canadian male models
Canadian male film actors
Canadian male television actors
Male actors from British Columbia
People from North Vancouver
20th-century Canadian male actors
21st-century Canadian male actors